The 1995 FIFA Women's World Cup, the second edition of the FIFA Women's World Cup, was held in Sweden and won by Norway, who became the first European nation to win the Women's World Cup. The tournament featured 12 women's national teams from six continental confederations. The 12 teams were drawn into three groups of four and each group played a round-robin tournament. At the end of the group stage, the top two teams and two best third-ranked teams advanced to the knockout stage, beginning with the quarter-finals and culminating with the final at Råsunda Stadium on 18 June 1995.

Sweden became the first country to host both men's and women's World Cup, having hosted the men's in 1958.

Australia, Canada, and England made their debuts in the competition. The tournament also hosted as qualification for the 1996 Summer Olympics, with the eight quarter-finalists being invited to the Olympics. In the second edition of the Women's World Cup, matches were lengthened to the standard 90 minutes, and three points were awarded for a win.

Summary
Bulgaria was originally awarded hosting rights for the tournament, but had to relinquish the rights and FIFA ended up awarding the tournament to Sweden. About 112,000 tickets were sold for the entire tournament.

As a FIFA rules experiment, each team was allowed a two-minute time out each half.

Norway won the 1995 title, with one in four Norwegians watching the game on television. Norway's team plane was escorted back to Oslo by two F-16s on their way to a victory celebration.

Venues

Teams

As in the previous edition of the FIFA Women's World cup, held in 1991, 12 teams participated in the final tournament. The teams were:

Squads
For a list of the squads that disputed the final tournament, see 1995 FIFA Women's World Cup squads.

Match officials

Notes

Draw
The draw for the group stage was held on 18 February 1995 in a public ceremony at the Elite Hotel Marina Plaza in Helsingborg, Sweden. The draw was conducted by Sepp Blatter, then the FIFA General Secretary, and assisted by Swedish internationals Tomas Brolin and Kristin Bengtsson, winners of the 1994 Guldbollen and Diamantbollen, respectively. There was no television coverage of the draw.

Group stage

Group A

Group B

Group C

Group C started with back-and-forth 3–3 draw between the United States and China with the Chinese coming back from a 3–1 deficit. Denmark's opening 5–0 win over Australia, in which Sonia Gegenhuber was sent off in the 45th minute for the Aussies, ultimately led to their securing one of the best third place runner up spots as they would lose their next two matches.

United States goalkeeper Brianna Scurry was sent off in the 88th minute of the second group game against Denmark. With all three substitutions used, U.S. manager Tony DiCicco called upon striker Mia Hamm to play goalkeeper. Hamm made two saves over eight minutes of stoppage time to secure the 2–0 win. In the other game, Angela Iannotta scored Australia's first-ever World Cup goal, but China defeated the Matildas 4–2.

Ranking of third-placed teams

Knockout stage

Bracket

Quarter-finals

Semi-finals

Third place play-off

Final

Awards

The following awards were given at the conclusion of the tournament:

Statistics

Goalscorers

Assists

Tournament ranking

References

External links
FIFA Women's World Cup Sweden 1995, FIFA.com
FIFA Technical Report (Part 1) and (Part 2)
SVT's open archive

 
FIFA
FIFA Women's World Cup tournaments
International women's association football competitions hosted by Sweden
Women's World Cup
Sports competitions in Gävle
Sports competitions in Västerås
Sports competitions in Karlstad
Sports competitions in Helsingborg
June 1995 sports events in Europe
Sports competitions in Solna